Jutta Anneli Poikolainen (née Vähäoja on 15 March 1963) is a retired Finnish archer. She competed at the 1988 Summer Olympics alongside her husband Tomi Poikolainen.

References

1963 births
Living people
Finnish female archers
Archers at the 1988 Summer Olympics
Olympic archers of Finland
Sportspeople from Tampere